Elite Model Look Serbia is an annual fashion modeling contest held by Models Inc. since 2012. www.modelsinc.rs The winner of the title takes it for one year, taking part later in Elite Model Look international contest.

Titleholders

EML Serbia for  Elite Model Look International

External links
Winners 1996-2003
Contestants 2002-2010
ELM Serbia 2007
ELM 2009
ELM 2008

References 

Beauty pageants in Serbia
Modeling competitions
Fashion events in Serbia
Recurring events established in 1996
1996 establishments in Serbia
Fashion weeks